is a railway station in Miyazaki City, Miyazaki Prefecture, Japan.

Lines
The station is also the northern terminus of the Nichinan Line.

Layout 
The station consists of two island platforms serving four tracks at grade. The station building is a modern two-storey concrete structure. The ticket window, passenger waiting area and ticket gates are located on level 2 which connects to a bridge which provides access to the two island platforms. There is a cafe and convenience store in the station building and parking is available at the station forecourt.

Management of the passenger facilities at the station has been outsourced to the JR Kyushu Tetsudou Eigyou Co., a wholly owned subsidiary of JR Kyushu specialising in station services. It staffs the ticket booth which is equipped with a Midori no Madoguchi facility.

Adjacent stations

Note 1. Although Minami-Miyazaki is the official terminus of the Nichinan Line, local trains provide a through-service to Miyazaki.
Note 2. Although Tayoshi, one stop to the south, is the official terminus and starting point of the Miyazaki Kūkō Line to Miyazaki Airport, local trains provide a through-service to Miyazaki, stopping by this station as well.

History
The private  (later renamed the Miyazaki Railway) opened the station on 31 October 1913 as the northern terminus of a line to Uchiumi (now closed) on the east coast of Kyushu. The Miyazaki Prefectural Railway was nationalized and JGR designated the track to Miyazaki as part of the Miyazaki Line and later, on 21 September 1917, the Miyazaki Main Line. On 15 December 1923, the entire stretch of track from Shigeoka through Miyazaki to Yoshimatsu, including Minami-Miyazaki, was designated as part of the Nippō Main Line.

The Miyazaki Railway line between Minami-Miyazaki and Uchiumi closed on 1 July 1962. A link up with Minami-Miyazaki was achieved on 8 May 1963 and JNR redesignated the entire stretch from Minami-Miyazaki to Shibushi as the Nichinan Line.

With the privatization of Japanese National Railways (JNR), the successor of JGR, on 1 April 1987, Minami-Miyazaki came under the control of JR Kyushu.

Throughout its history, the station has changed names several times. It was named  at its opening on 31 October 1913. On 1 July 1915, it was renamed . On 1 April 1942, its name was changed again to Minami-Miyazaki.

Passenger statistics
In fiscal 2016, the station was used by an average of 1,963 passengers daily (boarding passengers only), and it ranked 93rd among the busiest stations of JR Kyushu.

See also
List of railway stations in Japan

References

External links
Minami-Miyazaki (JR Kyushu)

Railway stations in Miyazaki Prefecture
Railway stations in Japan opened in 1913